Khavari (adjective form of Khavar (خاور (xâvar)) – meaning "east" – thus literally "eastern", "oriental") is a Dari and Persian surname. Notable people with the surname include:

 ʻAbdu'l-Hamíd Ishráq-Khávari (1902–1972), Iranian scholar of the Baháʼí Faith
 Ali Khavari (1923–2021), Iranian politician
 Farid Khavari (born 1943), Iranian American economist, author, patent-holder, designer and small business owner.
 Kathreen Khavari (born 1983), American actress
 Mahmoud Reza Khavari (born 1952), Iranian former banker

See also 
 Mowtowr-e Cheragh Khavari, village in Kerman Province, Iran

References 

Persian-language surnames
Dari-language surnames